Lukas Burkhart (born 27 April 1991 in Luzern) is a professional squash player who represents Switzerland. He reached a career-high world ranking of World No. 167 in June 2013.

References

External links 
 
 

Swiss male squash players
Living people
1991 births
Sportspeople from Lucerne